Russell Wilson (November 10, 1876 — November 27, 1946) was the mayor of Cincinnati, Ohio from 1930 to 1937. While at the University of Cincinnati, Wilson founded Sigma Sigma in 1898.

External links
 
 1933 Princeton alumni article about Wilson
 Excerpt from a book about Cincinnati's history

1876 births
1946 deaths
Princeton University alumni
University of Cincinnati College of Law alumni
Mayors of Cincinnati
Charter Party politicians